Villy Kragh (31 August 1936 – 12 December 2000) was a Danish footballer. He played in three matches for the Denmark national football team from 1959 to 1962.

References

External links
 

1936 births
2000 deaths
Danish men's footballers
Denmark international footballers
Place of birth missing
Association footballers not categorized by position